Pühajõgi is a river in Ida-Viru County, Estonia. The river is 36.5 km long and basin size is 219.7 km2. It runs into Gulf of Finland.

Trouts and Thymallus thymallus live also in the river.

References

Rivers of Estonia
Ida-Viru County